Mark DeAndre' LeGree (born July 8, 1989) is a former American football safety. He was selected by the Seattle Seahawks in the fifth round of the 2011 NFL Draft. He played collegiately with the Appalachian State University Mountaineers.

LeGree has also been a member of the Arizona Cardinals, San Francisco 49ers, New York Jets, Chicago Bears, Atlanta Falcons, and Buffalo Bills.

Early life
LeGree was born on St. Helena Island, South Carolina and played high school football at Pacelli High School in Columbus, Georgia, one of the smallest high schools in the state.

College career
LeGree was a three-time All-American in NCAA Division I Football Championship (Division I-AA) at Appalachian State. He intercepted 10 passes in 2008 and 7 in 2009 and 5 in 2010. LeGree amassed many awards and became one of the most highly decorated players to come out of App. State. LeGree currently holds records for total career interceptions and most interceptions in a season. Despite LeGree's all-state status in high school, he was not highly recruited at the college level. LeGree's offer to play at Appalachian State came only after he sent the school a video tape of his high school play.

Professional career

Seattle Seahawks
LeGree was drafted by the Seattle Seahawks with the 25th pick in the fifth round of the 2011 NFL Draft. The Seahawks were the only team to bring him in for a formal visit during the recruiting process. Due to the NFL labor dispute, LeGree attained a job working for a general contractor until the dispute was resolved.

Arizona Cardinals
LeGree was signed to the Arizona Cardinals' practice squad on September 21, 2011. He was released on October 5.

First stint with 49ers
LeGree was signed to the San Francisco 49ers' practice squad on November 15, 2011. He was released on November 29.

New York Jets
LeGree was signed to the New York Jets' practice squad on December 13, 2011.

Second stint with 49ers
The 49ers signed LeGree to a reserve/future contract on January 24, 2012. He was waived on August 11, 2012.

Chicago Bears
LeGree was signed by the Chicago Bears on August 20, 2012. He was waived on August 31.

Atlanta Falcons
The Atlanta Falcons signed LeGree to the practice squad on September 2, 2012.

Buffalo Bills
On August 7, 2013, LeGree was signed by the Buffalo Bills. On August 18, 2013, he was released by the Bills.

Saskatchewan Roughriders
LeGree signed with the Saskatchewan Roughriders on March 18, 2014. LeGree was cut September 15, 2015.

References

External links
 
   
 Appalachian State Mountaineers bio
 Atlanta Falcons bio

1989 births
Living people
Sportspeople from Beaufort, South Carolina
Sportspeople from Columbus, Georgia
Players of American football from Columbus, Georgia
Appalachian State Mountaineers football players
American football safeties
Seattle Seahawks players
Arizona Cardinals players
San Francisco 49ers players
New York Jets players
Chicago Bears players
Atlanta Falcons players
Buffalo Bills players
Saskatchewan Roughriders players
People from Saint Helena Island, South Carolina